Verey is an English surname. It is a variant of Very, which is of English origin. It derives from a locational name of an unidentified place in northern France, named with the Gaulish element "ver(n), alder, of the Gallo-Roman personal name "verus", true, and the local suffix "-acum". 

Development of the name since 1569 includes the following: William Very (1600, London), Robert (1613, Oxford) and Samuel Verry (1795, London). The modern surname can be found as Very, Verry, Verrey and Verey.

Notable persons with the surname include:

David Verey (born 1950), English banker and philanthropist
Henry Verey (1836–1920), British barrister, Official Referee of the Supreme Court of Judicature
Roger Verey (1912–2000), Polish Olympic rower
Rosemary Verey (1918–2001), British garden designer, lecturer and writer

References

English-language surnames